Prager (variants: Praeger, Preger) is a surname, which may refer to:

Prager
 David Prager (born 1977), American TV producer and blogger
 Dennis Prager (born 1948), U.S. conservative radio talk show host, columnist and public speaker
 PragerU, a right-wing conservative non-profit organization that creates videos on various political, economic and philosophical topics
 Felice Prager (born 1953), nee Klein, U.S. author, journalist, educational therapist
 Joshua P. Prager (born 1949), US physician
 Joshua Harris Prager, US journalist
 Mark Prager Lindo (1819–1879), Anglo-Dutch prose writer of English-Jewish descent
 Richard Prager (1883–1945), German-American astronomer
 Richard Prager (skier), West German para-alpine skier
 Susan Westerberg Prager (born 1942), Association of American Law Schools Executive Vice President and Executive Director from 2008
 Walter Prager (1910–1984), Swiss alpine skier
 William Prager (1903–1980), German-born US physicist

Fictional characters
 Nick Prager, a character from Dead to Me, portrayed by Brandon Scott

Präger
 Roy Präger (b. 1971), German footballer

Praeger
 Charles Praeger (1877-1940), architect
 Cheryl Praeger (born 1948), mathematician
 Emil Praeger (1882-1973), architect
 Ferdinand Praeger (1815-1891), composer and writer.
 Robert Lloyd Praeger (1865–1953), Irish naturalist and historian
 Rosamond Praeger (1867-1954), artist
 Sandy Praeger, Kansas Insurance Commissioner

Preger, Preager
 Andreja Preger (1912–2015), Austro-Hungarian-born pianist
 Jack Preger (born 1930), British doctor working in the Indian city of Kolkata
 Lou Preager (1906–1978), British dance band leader

See also
 Prager (crater), an impact crater on the Moon's far side
 Praeger Publishing, an imprint of the Greenwood Publishing Group

German-language surnames
Jewish surnames
Surnames of Czech origin